Mehmet Burak Kağan Uça (born 8 December 1989) is a Turkish-German footballer who plays as a forward or winger.

References

External links
 
 Profile at TFF

1989 births
Living people
Sportspeople from Mönchengladbach
Footballers from North Rhine-Westphalia
Turkish footballers
German footballers
Association football wingers
Association football forwards
3. Liga players
TFF First League players
TFF Second League players
Wuppertaler SV players
Göztepe S.K. footballers
Altay S.K. footballers
Alanyaspor footballers
İnegölspor footballers
SV 19 Straelen players